Spencer v Harding (1870) LR 5 CP 561 is an English contract law case concerning the requirements of offer and acceptance in the formation of a contract. The case established that an offer inviting tenders to be submitted for the purchase of stock did not amount to an offer capable of acceptance to sell that stock, but rather amounted to an invitation to treat.

Facts
The Defendants sent out a circular containing the following wording:

The Defendants did not promise to sell the stock to the highest bidder for cash. The Claimants sent a tender to the Defendants which, following the submission of all tenders, was the highest tender. The Defendants refused to sell the stock to the Claimants.

The Defendants submitted that the circular was not intended to be a binding offer capable of acceptance. Rather, it was merely a circular inviting others to make offers. The Claimants submitted that the circular did constitute a valid offer and that the Claimant had, by submitting the highest tender and attending all the necessary meetings, accepted that offer.

Judgment
Willes J held that the circular was not an offer, but merely an invitation to gather tenders, upon which the Defendants were entitled to act. Willes, J. held that the absence of any specific wording such as "and we undertake to sell to the highest bidder" rebutted any presumption that the Defendants had intended to be bound by a contract and distinguished the present circumstances from instances of reward contract offers or an offer to the world.

Keating J and Montague Smith J concurred.

See also
Contract
Offer and acceptance
Invitation to treat
Carlill v Carbolic Smoke Ball Company (for an instance of an offer to the world)
Partridge v Crittenden (for an instance of an advertisement as an invitation to treat)
Blackpool & Fylde Aero Club v Blackpool Borough Council (offer for tenders binding if accompanied by collateral contract)

Notes

1869 in case law
1869 in British law
Court of Common Pleas (England) cases
English agreement case law
United Kingdom company case law